Ciulfina klassi is a species of praying mantis in the family Nanomantidae. C. klassi mantises are endemic to the forests of Northeastern Australia, preferring narrow trees with smooth bark.

See also
List of mantis genera and species

References

Liturgusidae
Insects of Australia
Insects described in 2007